James Michael Spady (born January 5, 1966) is an American college football coach and former player. He is currently the associate head coach and tight ends coach at Florida A&M University. Spady previously served as the head coach at Alabama Agricultural and Mechanical University (AAMU), a position he held from December 2013 until November 2017.  Spady is a member of Phi Beta Sigma fraternity.

Head coaching record

References

External links
 Alabama A&M profile

1966 births
Living people
American football centers
Alabama A&M Bulldogs football coaches
Denver Dynamite (arena football) players
Grambling State Tigers football coaches
Nevada Wolf Pack football coaches
North Carolina Central Eagles football coaches
Sacramento Attack players
South Carolina State Bulldogs football coaches
UTEP Miners football coaches
UTEP Miners football players
Sportspeople from Biloxi, Mississippi
Players of American football from San Antonio
African-American coaches of American football
African-American players of American football
20th-century African-American sportspeople
21st-century African-American sportspeople